Moraine Park Technical College (Moraine Park Tech or MPTC) is a Public technical college in Fond du Lac, Wisconsin. It was established in 1912 and is part of the Wisconsin Technical College System. It has campuses in Fond du Lac, Beaver Dam, and West Bend, and regional centers in Jackson and Ripon. The college offers more than 100 associate of applied science degrees, technical diplomas, apprenticeships, and certificates.

Accreditations and approvals
Moraine Park Technical College is accredited by the Higher Learning Commission and approved by the Wisconsin Technical College System and the Wisconsin Educational Approval Board for Veteran’s Training. Several programs are accredited or approved by other agencies, including:

Automotive Technician – National Automotive Technicians Education Foundation
Culinary Arts – American Culinary Federation
Emergency Medical Technician – Paramedic – Commission on Accreditation of Allied Health Education Programs (CAAHEP) in cooperation with the Committee on Accreditation of Educational Programs for the Emergency Medical Services Professions (CoA EMSP).
Health Information Technology – Commission on Accreditation for Health Informatics and Information Management Education
Medical Assistant – Commission of Accreditation of Allied Health Educational Programs and American Association of Medical Assistants
Medical Laboratory Technician – National Accrediting Agency for Clinical Laboratory Sciences
Nursing – Accreditation Commission for Education in Nursing, Inc. and the Wisconsin Board of Nursing
Paramedic Technician - Commission on Accreditation of Allied Health Education Programs (CAAHEP) in cooperation with the Committee on Accreditation of Educational Programs for the Emergency Medical Services Professions (CoA EMSP).
Radiography – Joint Review Committee on Education in Radiologic Technology
Respiratory Therapist – Committee of Accreditation for Respiratory Care
Substance Abuse Counseling – Department of Safety and Professional Services
Surgical Technology – Commission on Accreditation of Allied Health Education Programs and Accreditation Review Committee for Surgical Technology

Campuses
The Moraine Park Technical College District comprises all of Fond du Lac, and Green Lake counties, most of Dodge, and Washington counties, and portions of six other counties.

Twenty-six K-12 school districts are found within the Moraine Park Technical College District borders.

The college has campuses in Beaver Dam, Fond du Lac, and West Bend; regional centers in Jackson, and Ripon; and evening classes at high schools and other facilities throughout the district.

References

External links
Official website

Wisconsin technical colleges
Fond du Lac, Wisconsin
Education in Dodge County, Wisconsin
Education in Washington County, Wisconsin
Educational institutions established in 1917
Education in Fond du Lac County, Wisconsin
1917 establishments in Wisconsin

